Golnar Khosrowshahi (born September 18, 1971) is an Iranian-Canadian businesswoman and the CEO and Founder of Reservoir Media Management, Inc. She is currently a member of the New York Philharmonic Board of Directors, and she also served as Board Chair for of Silkroad, a musical collective founded by cellist Yo-Yo Ma in 2000.
Khosrowshahi is the daughter of Hassan Khosrowshahi, an Iranian-Canadian investor and philanthropist, and she is the cousin of Dara Khosrowshahi, the current CEO of Uber.

Early life and education
Khosrowshahi was born on September 18, 1971 in Tehran, Iran to Hassan Khosrowshahi and Nezhat Khosrowshahi.

Her father, Hassan, was educated in Iran and England and obtained his degree in law and economics from the University of Tehran. In 1961, at the age of 21, he joined the family business. In 1979, during the Iranian Revolution, Minoo Industrial Group was nationalized and the family was targeted for its wealth. The family fled the country and settled in Vancouver in 1981.

Khosrowshahi's brother, Behzad, runs DRI Capital, a pharmaceutical royalty firm, and her cousin Dara Khosrowshahi has been the CEO of Uber since August 2017.

She received her BA from Bryn Mawr College and her MBA from Columbia University.

Career
Khosrowshahi founded Reservoir in 2007 as a Music Publishing company. The company has since expanded to a full-service music company with 140,000 copyrights, 36,000 master recordings dating back to the 1900s, and with offices in New York City, Los Angeles, Nashville, Toronto, and London. In 2021, Reservoir also became a publicly traded company, listed on the Nasdaq stock exchange under the ticker RSVR.

In recent years, the company has expanded via acquisition, including acquiring TVT Music Enterprises in 2010, Reverb Music in 2012, P&P Songs in 2013, Chrysalis Records in 2019 and Shapiro Bernstein in 2020. In 2021, Reservoir Media also acquired Tommy Boy Records for a reported $100 million dollars.

Reservoir has since earned the Publisher of the Year Award at Music Business Worldwide’s The A&R Awards in 2017 and 2019. The company also won Music Week’s Independent Publisher of the Year in 2020 and in 2022.

Outside the company, working alongside Artist Director and cellist Yo-Yo Ma, Khosrowshahi served as Board Chair of Silkroad, a musical collective founded in 2000, and now serves as a Director. She is also a Director on the board of the National Music Publishers Association (NMPA), a trade association representing all American music publishers and their songwriting partners (since June 2015), a member of the Steering Committee of the Asia Society Triennial, a multi-venue festival of art, ideas and innovation that focuses on art from and about Asia and the diaspora (since May 2019), and as board member of Restaurant Brands International, one of the world’s largest quick service restaurant companies with more than $34 billion in system-wide sales and approximately 27,000 restaurants in more than 100 countries and U.S. territories. Khosrowshahi was also named a member of the board of directors of Nomad Foods (2021-2022). In 2022, she joined the New York Philharmonic Board of Directors.

She is a director emeritus of the Hospital for Sick Children Foundation in Toronto and a trustee emeritus of Pearson College, a United World College.

Awards and accolades
Khosrowshahi was named to Billboard’s Power List in 2020 and 2022, and was honored as one of Billboard’s Most Powerful Female Executives in 2017, 2018 and 2019 and a Billboard Indie Power Player in 2017 and 2018. Additionally, in 2022, Billboard named her the recipient of the Executive of the Year Award at their annual Women In Music Awards. That same year, Khosrowshahi was named to Variety's New York Women's Impact Report 2022.

Personal life
Khosrowshahi lives in New York City. She is a classically trained pianist through the Royal Academy of Music in London, England and the Royal Conservatory of Music in Canada.

References 



1971 births
Living people
Bryn Mawr College alumni
Columbia Business School alumni
Music industry executives
Canadian people of Iranian descent
Canadian women company founders
21st-century Canadian businesspeople